Shanthilal Devapriya Jayaratne MBBS, MD Post Graduate Institute of Medicine, Colombo, FRCP, FCCP (known as S. D. Jayaratne) was a professor of medicine at University of Sri Jayewardenepura and was Chairman of State Pharmaceuticals Corporation of Sri Lanka (SPC) and State Pharmaceuticals Manufacturing Corporation (SPMC).

Early life

Jayaratne was born in 1951 and educated at Nalanda College, Colombo. After passing the GCE Advanced Level in Sri Lanka in science stream he entered medical faculty of the University of Colombo and graduated as a Medical Doctor with a Bachelor of Medicine, Bachelor of Surgery.

Career

After completing his internship at the then General Hospital Colombo (currently National Hospital of Sri Lanka) he was appointed to Kurunegala Hospital. At a later stage he was attached to Panadura Hospital too. Later for post graduate higher education studies, Jayaratne went to United Kingdom and after completion and upon arrival back to Sri Lanka joine  North Colombo Medical College Hospital and worked as a Specialist Doctor in  Ragama Hospital.  Later when University of Sri Jayewardenepura opened its Faculty of Medical Sciences, he joined it as a senior lecturer while doing clinical work at the Kalubowila Hospital. He has been a chairman of board of study i Medicine of the Post graduate Institute of medicine, University of Colombo and later as Chairperson of the Board of Management of the same Institue. In it Jubilee year in 2017 of the Ceylon College of Physicians he was the President of the College. From 2019 he has been appointed as Chairman of the Sri Jayewardenepura Hospital and Postgraduate Centre as its Chairman.

References

 

 
 
 

 

 

 

Sri Lankan Buddhists
Sinhalese physicians
Alumni of Nalanda College, Colombo
1951 births
Living people